Slammin' Watusis was an American punk rock and heavy metal group.  They signed a record deal with CBS Records in 1987, which resulted in  two albums, a self-titled debut album in 1988 and Kings of Noise in 1989. Both albums were released by Epic Records.

They were influenced by Kiss, The Dickies, The Damned, Jackie McClean, Jimmy Reed, and Francis the Talking Mule.

The band had five members: lead singer and guitarist Lee Popa, guitarist Mark Durante, wind instruments Frank Raven, bassist Clay Watusi, and drummer Benny Saffire.

A spinoff band, The Blue Watusis, was formed to play a more blues-oriented sound.

References

External links 
 

Heavy metal musical groups from Illinois
Punk rock groups from Illinois
Musical groups from Chicago